Cisauk Station (CSK) is a class III railway station located on the border between Sampora Village, Cisauk and Cibogo Village, Cisauk, Tangerang Regency, Banten. The station which is located at an altitude of +48 meters is the most southeastern train station in Tangerang Regency and only serves KRL Commuterline trips. This station is also located near the BSD City planned community.

History 
In order for the mobility of passengers from Batavia to Rangkasbitung to the Banten area to run more smoothly, in the 1890s the Staatsspoorwegen company built a railroad line and its stations (including Cisauk Station in 1901, which at that time was still a railway stop) that connected the Duri Station to Rangkasbitung, passing through the Tanah Abang. This project was completed in 1899, and regular trains serving the route were immediately started.

Building and layout 
Initially, this station had a total of 3 lines. During the time when the Tanah Abang–Rangkasbitung railway was a single track, line 1 was a straight track and track 2 was a turning track, these two lines were used for passing and crossing trains, until finally line 2 also became a straight track after the double track project or double track segment from Serpong–Parung Panjang was completed in 2012. There is also a buffer stop line that is a dead end at the station building (from the direction of Serpong Station), this line which was still in use until 2015 was usually used for loading and unloading, yards, and storage or stabling a series of carriages transporting stone fragments, until finally the buffer stop line was dismantled and the freight train service for transporting stone fragments at this station ceased to exist.

As of 1 February 2019, Cisauk Station has completed a major renovation to become a modern and spacious station. The new station building was built to accommodate long train cars (12 trains cars) and has more complete and international standard facilities. This station has a futuristic minimalist architectural style, complete with special facilities for breastfeeding women, toilets, disabled facilities, and skybridge.

Even though Cisauk Station has been renovated, the old station building which is a legacy of the Staatsspoorwegen is still maintained and the train dispatcher room (PPKA) which is also part of the old station building is still in use today. Also, the remains of the old low island platform which is located between lines 1 and 2 can still be seen because they were not dismantled during the station renovation project.

Stations

Passenger services

KRL Commuterline

Supporting transportation

Gallery

References 

Banten